The 2011–12 season will be Rah Ahan Football Club's 7th season in the Iran Pro League, and their 65th consecutive season in the top division of Iranian football. They will also be competing in the Hazfi Cup and 75th year in existence as a football club.

Player

Iran Pro League squad
As of August 3, 2011

   
                                                                           
For recent transfers, see List of Iranian football transfers, summer 2011.

Transfers
Confirmed transfers 2011–12
 Updated on 1 August 2011

In:

Out:

Competitions

Iran Pro League

 Standings 

 Results summary 

 Results by round 

Matches

Hazfi Cup

 Matches 

 Round of 32 

Friendly Matches

Statistics

Top scorers
Includes all competitive matches. The list is sorted by shirt number when total goals are equal.Last updated on 14 February 2012Friendlies and Pre season goals are not recognized as competitive match goals.Top assistors
Includes all competitive matches. The list is sorted by shirt number when total assistors are equal.Friendlies and Pre season goals are not recognized as competitive match assist.''

Own goals 
 Updated on 2 April 2011

Club

Coaching staff

Other information

See also
2011–12 Persian Gulf Cup
2011–12 Hazfi Cup

References

External links
Iran Premier League Statistics
Persian League

Iranian football clubs 2011–12 season